Mahidasht Rural District is a rural district (dehestan) in Mahidasht District, Kermanshah County, Kermanshah Province, Iran. At the 2006 census, its population was 13,107, in 3,045 families. The rural district has 78 villages.

References 

Rural Districts of Kermanshah Province
Kermanshah County